Vashadze is a Georgian surname, which may refer to:

 Giorgi Vashadze (born 1981), Georgian politician
 Grigol Vashadze (born 1958), Georgian politician and diplomat

See also
 Vasadze (disambiguation), including people with the surname

Georgian-language surnames